The island night lizard (Xantusia riversiana) is a species of night lizard native to three of the Channel Islands of California: San Nicolas Island, Santa Barbara Island, and San Clemente Island. A small number of island night lizards also live on Sutil Island, near Santa Barbara Island.

Etymology
The specific name, riversiana, is in honor of James John Rivers (1824–1913), a London-born physician and naturalist, who was Curator of Natural History at the University of California.

Subspecies
The San Clemente Island population is a recognized subspecies, the San Clemente night lizard (Xantusia riversiana reticulata).

Conservation status
The Island night lizard was listed as a threatened species under the Endangered Species Act (ESA) in the United States since 1977; the International Union for Conservation of Nature (IUCN) lists the species as vulnerable. In 2006, the US Fish and Wildlife Service, the administrating agency for the ESA, removed the San Clemente subspecies from the ESA. Better control of munitions-sparked wildfires may have been a reason.  In March 2014, The US Fish and Wildlife Service removed the species from the Federal List of Threatened and Endangered Wildlife.  This removal was attributed to the removal of non-native animals such as cats and goats from the islands and partnering between the US Fish and Wildlife Service and the US Navy.

Habitat
The island night lizard's preferred habitat is coastal scrub made up of dense boxthorn and cacti thickets.

Reproduction
Like other night lizards, the island night lizard bears live young rather than laying eggs. The island night lizard is much larger than another species in the genus Xantusia, the desert night lizard (Xantusia vigilis) of southern California.

Description
They typically live between 11 and 13 years, but some individuals are estimated to have lived 30 years or more. Their color varies from pale ash gray and beige to brown and black. They may have uniform, mottled, and striped patterns.

See also
 Island fence lizard

References

Sources
 "Island Night Lizard Removed from Endangered Species List Due to Recovery." Pacific Southwest Region - US Fish & Wildlife Service. United States Fish and Wildlife Service, 31 Mar. 2014. Web. 24 Apr. 2014. <http://www.fws.gov/cno/press/release.cfm?rid=594>.

Further reading
Behler JL, King FW (1979). The Audubon Society Field Guide to North American Reptiles and Amphibians. New York: Alfred A. Knopf. 743 pp. . (Xantusia riversiana, p. 551 + Plate 408).
Boulenger GA (1885). Catalogue of the Lizards in the British Museum (Natural History). Second Edition. Volume II. ... Xantusiidæ ... London: Trustees of the British Museum (Natural History). (Taylor and Francis, printers). xiii + 497 pp. + Plates I-XXIV. (Xantusia riversiana, p. 327).
Cope ED (1883). "Notes on the Geographical Distribution of Batrachia and Reptilia in Western North America". Proc. Acad. Nat. Sci. Philadelphia 35: 10–35. (Xantusia riversiana, new species, pp. 29–32).
Smith HM (1946). "A subspecies of the lizard Xantusia riversiana ". J. Washington Acad. Sci. 36 (11): 392–393. (Xantusia riversiana reticulata, new subspecies).
Smith HM, Brodie ED Jr (1982). Reptiles of North America: A Guide to Field Identification. New York: Golden Press. 240 pp.  (paperback),  (hardcover). (Klauberina riversiana, pp. 84–85).
Stebbins RC (2003). A Field Guide to Western Reptiles and Amphibians, Third Edition. The Peterson Field Guide Series ®. Boston and New York: Houghton Mifflin Company. xiii + 533 pp. . (Xantusia riversiana, p. 309 + Plate 35 + Map 76).
Stejneger L, Barbour T (1917). A Check List of North American Amphibians and Reptiles. Cambridge, Massachusetts: Harvard University Press. 125 pp. (Xantusia riversiana, p. 64).

Xantusia
Reptiles of the United States
Endemic fauna of California
Fauna of the Channel Islands of California
Fauna of the California chaparral and woodlands
Lizards of North America
Reptiles described in 1883
Taxa named by Edward Drinker Cope